Marshside is a suburb of the town of Southport, Merseyside, England.
It is part of the ancient parish of North Meols and was formerly a detached settlement, on the northern fringe of what is now Southport.

Marshside's most notable features are neighbours: the SSSI and nature reserve on the opposite side of Marine Drive. The sandwinning plant closed in early 2007. Whilst operational, it extracted thousands of tonnes of Southport sand per year for use in industry. The nature reserve is managed by the RSPB and provides food and accommodation to many native and migratory birds.

Marshside's traditional industry was shrimping, and the practice still continues to a diminished degree today.

Marshside has four schools: Marshside Primary School, St Patrick's Primary School, Larkfield Primary School (between Larkfield Lane and Preston New Road) and Stanley High School (on Fleetwood Road). The last of these is the largest, with around 800 pupils between the ages of 11 and 16.

Marshside has surprisingly few pubs (compared with neighbouring Churchtown), possibly in part due to the strong tradition of Methodism in the former village. However, there is the Shrimper on Fylde Road (next to The Co-operative Food). The Shrimper is a food-serving pub and part of a large chain. A notable feature is a fish & chip shop built on to the back of the building in the car park, although this is no longer operational, but that has been replaced with a new fish and chip shop, otherwise known as Fylde Fish Bar next to The Co-operative Food and Fylde Road Pharmacy.

St Patrick's Parish Club on Marshside Road is another establishment licensed to serve alcohol. Situated at the back of the old church, the members club is open throughout the week. The only other place to serve alcohol in Marshside is the Fleetwood Hesketh Sports & Social Club, on Fylde Road. Built on land acquired from the Meols Hall estate in Churchtown, this private members club has various sports teams including football, cricket, crown green and indoor bowls, darts, and snooker.

Marshside is also home to the only brass band in Southport.

The main modern industry in Marshside is situated on the estate behind the Shrimper pub, housed in a number of metal-clad buildings. There is a bakery and a publisher's warehouse amongst others.

In the early twentieth century, Marshside had its own completely unique dialect feature, involving a parasitic nasal consonant, occurring after certain final consonants, mostly plosives, in words at the end of a sense group, and before the plural inflexion [z] medially and at the end of a sense group.

References

External links 

 North Meols Civic Society: Marshside Fog Bell
 RSPB Marshside - Jewel of the Ribble
 A visit to the RSPB Marshside reserve in a personal 'blog' (November 2006)
 Marshside Brass Band

Southport
Towns and villages in the Metropolitan Borough of Sefton